Petchia madagascariensis is a plant in the family Apocynaceae.

Description
Its flowers feature a creamy to yellow corolla. The fruit is orange with paired cylindrical follicles. Local traditional medicinal uses include as a treatment for stomach-ache, gonorrhoea, rheumatism, gout, malaria and as a diuretic and anthelmintic.

Distribution and habitat
Petchia madagascariensis is endemic to Madagascar. Its habitat is evergreen forest, mostly coastal, from sea level to  altitude.

References

madagascariensis
Plants used in traditional African medicine
Endemic flora of Madagascar
Plants described in 1844